Airport Tunnel may refer to:
Airport Tunnel (Calgary), on Airport Trail
Airport Tunnel (Las Vegas), between Paradise Road and the Airport Connector (unsigned NV 171)
Airport Tunnel (Los Angeles), on Sepulveda Boulevard (CA 1)
Airport Tunnel (Montreal), unnamed tunnel on A-13
Airport Tunnel, Hong Kong, a tunnel connecting the Hong Kong-Zhuhai-Macau Bridge Hong Kong Control Point and the Hong Kong International Airport
 Airport Tunnel, former name of the Kai Tak Tunnel in New Kowloon
 Schiphol Tunnel at Amsterdam Airport Schiphol which the Rijksweg 4 takes
 A538 road across the southern ends of both runways at Manchester Airport